Thaleropis is a monotypic genus of butterflies in the family Nymphalidae. Its only species is the Ionian emperor, Thaleropis ionia.

External links
"Thaleropis Staudinger in Staudinger & Wocke, 1871" at Markku Savela's Lepidoptera and Some Other Life Forms

Apaturinae
Nymphalidae genera
Taxa named by Otto Staudinger